Caldey Abbey is an abbey of the Trappists situated on Caldey Island off the coast of Pembrokeshire, Wales, south of Tenby.

Caldey Island has been known as one of the centres of Cistercian activity since Celtic times and thrived during medieval Europe. However, the current abbey was built in 1910 by Anglican Benedictine monks. At the time of building, the abbey was called "the greatest phenomenon in the Anglican community at the present time". The abbey passed to the Trappist order in 1929. As of 2018, there are about 10 members. They are known for their lavender perfume, shortbread and chocolate production, and opened an online shop in 2001.

The Abbey came under scrutiny in 2017 when some historic instances of child abuse emerged.

History
A Celtic monastery was founded on the island in the sixth century, and a Benedictine foundation existed from 1136 until the dissolution of the monasteries in 1536. Pyro was the first abbot and Saint Samson was one of the early abbots.

William Done Bushell offered the island to Dom Aelred Carlyle in 1900. An Anglican Benedictine community, led by Carlyle, arrived six years later in 1906, and built the current abbey in the Italian style with assistance from Lord Halifax and others between 1906 and 1910. Initially a row of cottages were built for the people working on the building; hence the abbey was named as "cottage Monastery." The chapel was added in 1910. Three years later the monks were received by the Roman Catholic Church, except for a small Anglican remnant which left Caldey and moved into Abbey House, next to Pershore Abbey, Worcestershire. This was a house which had belonged to Caldey Abbey, but was returned in 1913 to its original, Anglican donor. The Anglican Benedictine community moved on from Pershore to Nashdom Abbey in 1926.

The Catholic Benedictines moved to Prinknash Abbey, Gloucestershire by 1928. The much stricter Trappist Order, who now occupy the abbey, came in 1929 from Scourmont Abbey in Belgium. The monastery was rebuilt in 1940 after a fire.

Monastic life
Perfume, shortbread and chocolate production all provide income for the monks, as well as the sale of prime beef. The monastery opened an internet shop in 2001. Chocolate is also sold under the "Abbot's Kitchen" brand. The monastery used to operate a now-defunct dairy which would sell iced confectionery and cake.

Lavender perfume
Profuse growth of wild lavender flowers on Caldey Island prompted the monks of the abbey to create scents with new fragrances. They branded the scents and marketed them with the brand name “Caldey Abbey Perfumes.” With booming demand for this brand of scent there was need to import scent oil from outside the island. The scent is now manufactured throughout the year and is partly based on the island's gorse.

Architecture and fittings

The structure is considered to be the most complete example of the Arts and Crafts style in the country. It was also John Coates Carter's largest project. The roofs are of white roughcast with red tiling, while the large basement arches are of brick. The abbey church has a south tower, with five side-windows, and has a "tapering" tower with primitive crenellations. The windows are simple, with lead glazing. Originally the fittings included silver and ebony altar decorations and other luxurious items, but many were destroyed in the 1940 fire. The refectory of the Abbey was made from fine timber, and although inspired by an ancient pattern, it was modern in design. Two large water tanks underground and a narrow water shaft eliminate the threat of water scarcity in dry seasons.

It is a Grade II* listed building, as is the Abbey Shop, as well as a number of other buildings on the island.

Child abuse lawsuit
In August 2016, three women launched legal action against the abbey seeking compensation for sexual abuse they had suffered at the hands of one of the abbey's monks between 1972 and 1987, when they were children. They alleged that Father Thaddeus Kotik, who lived in the abbey from 1947 until his death in 1992, abused at least six girls. He is said to have used chocolate from the abbey dairy and sweets in a chest in the garage to strike up relationships with girls whose families holidayed on the island, before assaulting them. The abbey reached a financial settlement with six claimants and apologised for failing to report the abuse when they became aware of it in 1990; Dyfed–Powys Police were made aware in 2014 and 2016.

In November 2017, as a result of media coverage of the allegations, a further five women came forward to accuse Kotik of abusing them. At the same time it emerged that Paul Ashton, a fugitive child sex offender, had fled to the abbey in 2004 and remained there until 2011 using a pseudonym. He was arrested after a visitor recognised him from Crimestoppers' "Most Wanted" list. During his time at the abbey Ashton, who had absconded from West Sussex, operated the island's satellite internet and telephone systems, managed online accommodation bookings and accounts, and worked in the mail room. Ashton pleaded guilty to possessing more than 5,000 indecent images of children, including on computer equipment at the abbey.

In 2021 an alleged male victim came forward, demanding a public enquiry into the events and subsequent cover-up.

See also
 Caldey Priory

References

Bibliography

External links

Grade II* listed buildings in Pembrokeshire
Benedictine monasteries in Wales
Cistercian monasteries in Wales
Child sexual abuse in Wales
Sexual abuse cover-ups
Trappist monasteries in the United Kingdom